Harrison Arley Mojica Betancourt (born 17 February 1993) is a Colombian footballer who plays as a midfielder for 9 de Octubre F.C.

Honours

Colombia
South American Youth Championship: 2013

References

External links

 

1993 births
Living people
Colombian footballers
Colombia under-20 international footballers
Categoría Primera A players
Deportivo Cali footballers
Cortuluá footballers
Atlético Bucaramanga footballers
Jaguares de Córdoba footballers
Millonarios F.C. players
People from Palmira, Valle del Cauca
Association football midfielders
Sportspeople from Valle del Cauca Department
21st-century Colombian people